Buck Mountain is a summit in Madison County in the U.S. state of Missouri.

Buck Mountain was so named because the area was the hunting ground of bucks by early settlers.

References

Mountains of Madison County, Missouri
Mountains of Missouri